The Fair Land Tax – Tax Party is a registered minor political party in South Australia led by Andrew Desyllas. Its platform consists of more favourable land tax rates. It ran at the 2010 state election with negligible results. The party contested the 2014 state election again with negligible results.

References

External links
Fair Land Tax - Tax Party homepage

See also
List of political parties in Australia
No Land Tax Campaign

Political parties in South Australia